The 2022 Nagano  gubernatorial election was held on 7 August 2022 to elect the next governor of , a prefecture of Japan located in the Chūbu region of Honshu island. Incumbent Governor Shuichi Abe was re-elected for a fourth term, defeating Chuichi Kanai with 88.84% of the vote.

Candidates 

Shuichi Abe, 61, incumbent since 2010, bureaucrat. Backed by DPFP, LDP, Komeito, CDP and SDP.
Chuichi Kanai, 72, farmer, former member of the Ueda Municipal Assembly. Candidate of the JCP.
Shigeo Kusama, 72, former school staff.

Results

References 

2022 elections in Japan
Nagano gubernational elections
Politics of Nagano Prefecture